Weapon P.R.I.M.E. is a group of fictional superhuman operatives appearing in American comic books published by Marvel Comics. They are usually depicted as acting under the authority of Canada's Department K. They became Canada's preeminent superhero team after the demise of Alpha Flight. Their first appearance and mission was in X-Force #11-14. As revealed in the Official Handbook of the Marvel Universe: A-Z, "P.R.I.M.E." stands for "PRototype Induced Mutation Echelon."

Team History
The Weapon P.R.I.M.E. project was first activated for combat by Garrison Kane, the then-current Weapon X, in order to track down Cable and bring him to justice for perceived crimes. X-Force had just been involved in a fiery New York hostage situation (their first media appearance) that made S.H.I.E.L.D. and Department K question what sort of role the team had played. Kane and G. W. Bridge, both former members of the Six Pack and very angry about what Cable did to them, tried to convince their organizations that Cable needed to be brought down with or without proof of current crimes. On his very next mission, Weapon X was ambushed by the MLF during a raid and taken to Stryfe, who took off his helmet and convinced the astonished and angry Kane, that Stryfe and Cable were one and the same person, and definitely terrorist. Given the proof they needed, Kane and Bridge had Weapon P.R.I.M.E.'s mission approved, with SHIELD opting to let Project K solely run it. Of the members, Yeti and Tygerstryke were original to the program, Rictor joined to take vengeance on Cable for killing his father (actually done by Stryfe), and Grizzly joined as another former member of the Six Pack who had an axe to grind with Cable. This was the original team.

Their first mission was to ambush Cable and X-Force at their base in the Adirondacks. They attacked just as X-Force was preparing to vacate the base, as its secrecy had already been compromised by Tolliver and Deadpool. The base had been rigged to self-destruct, and it did just that during Weapon P.R.I.M.E.'s fight to capture Cable. Cable escaped, and they tried to capture the members of X-Force instead, also failing at that. Instead, X-Force ended up recruiting Rictor and escaping with the IPAC. After this Grizzly left the team and Bridge and Kane resumed their normal duties.

The new and final line-up consisted of Tygerstryke, Yeti, Double Trouble, and Killjoy (aka Killspree). They were next seen attempting to stop former Six Pack members Grizzly, Domino, and Hammer from stealing files on Cable from Department K. The infiltrators downloaded the entire chunk of encrypted data, and narrowly escaped the team by going through the ceiling and ductwork.

After the demise of Alpha Flight, Weapon P.R.I.M.E. was sent after Northstar. They tracked him to a villa on the north coast of Ibiza, but are given the slip and accidentally kill the wrong man outside. They ransack the house, annoyed by the fact that his sheets were even still warm. They next track Northstar to Zuyevo, Russia; and find him being attacked by circus performers under mind-control by Arcade. Northstar immediately surrenders to the team, at which point the team itself comes under attack by the circus performers! Killspree thinks they're part of a trap set by Northstar, but Northstar convinces Tygerstryke of the mind-control, and together they find and destroy Arcade's device. Northstar then escapes (with the help of Guardian), and is next caught up with by Weapon P.R.I.M.E. at the top of the New Orleans World Trade Center. Tygerstryke sees him and radios the rest of the team, but is attacked by Guardian who tells him they'll all have to go through her to get to Northstar. Tygerstryke grimaces and admits it wouldn't seem worth it, as the action in Russia made him think well of Northstar. Guardian tells him to get used to bending the rules sometimes, as that's what it will take to replace Alpha Flight.

References

External links
 WEAPON P.R.I.M.E.—Team page at UXN
 

Comics characters introduced in 1994
Fictional Canadian people in comics
Marvel Comics teams
X-Men supporting characters